Henry Tefft Clarke Sr. (April 26, 1834 – February 3, 1913) was an American businessman, pioneer, and politician from Nebraska.

Born in Greenwich, New York, he was educated in the local schools. He moved to Cleveland, Ohio and eventually to Nebraska Territory, where he built railroads and bridges. Eventually, he opened a retail drug company and helped platted Bellevue, Nebraska. In 1862, he served in the Nebraska Territorial House of Representatives and in 1864, he was elected to the Nebraska Territorial Council. He also served on the Omaha, Nebraska Board of Education also during this time. His children include lawyer Henry Clarke,  football coach and oil businessman Maurice Gordon Clarke, and philanthropist Gertrude Clarke Whittall. He died in Excelsior Springs, Missouri.

Notes

People from Bellevue, Nebraska
People from Greenwich (town), New York
American city founders
Businesspeople from Nebraska
Members of the Nebraska Territorial Legislature
School board members in Nebraska
1834 births
1913 deaths
19th-century American politicians
19th-century American businesspeople